Scrooged is a 1988 American Christmas fantasy comedy film directed by Richard Donner and written by Mitch Glazer and Michael O'Donoghue. Based on the 1843 novella A Christmas Carol by Charles Dickens, Scrooged is a modern retelling that follows Bill Murray as Frank Cross, a cynical and selfish television executive who is visited by a succession of ghosts on Christmas Eve intent on helping him regain his Christmas spirit. The film also stars Karen Allen, John Forsythe, Bobcat Goldthwait, Carol Kane, Robert Mitchum, Michael J. Pollard, and Alfre Woodard.

Scrooged was filmed on a $32 million budget over three months in New York City and Hollywood. Murray returned to acting for the film after taking a four-year hiatus following the success of Ghostbusters, which he found overwhelming. Murray worked with Glazer and O'Donoghue on reworking the script before agreeing to join the project. The production was tumultuous, as Murray and Donner had different visions for the film. Murray described his time on the film as "misery", while Donner called Murray "superbly creative but occasionally difficult". Along with Murray's three brothers, Brian, John, and Joel, Scrooged features numerous celebrity cameos.

The film's marketing capitalized on Murray's Ghostbusters role, referencing his encounters with ghosts in both films. Scrooged was released on November 23, 1988, and grossed over $100 million worldwide. The film received a positive response from test audiences, but was met with a mixed response upon its release from critics who found the film either too mean spirited or too sentimental. It was nominated for an Academy Award for Best Makeup, but lost to the fantasy-comedy film Beetlejuice.

Since its release, Scrooged has become a regular television Christmastime feature, with some critics calling it an alternative to traditional Christmas films, and others arguing that Scrooged was ahead of its time, making it relevant in the modern day. It has appeared on various lists of the best Christmas films.

Plot 
IBC Television executive Frank Cross is pushing his company to broadcast an extravagant live production of A Christmas Carol on Christmas Eve, making the staff work throughout the holiday. Frank fires executive Eliot Loudermilk for disagreeing with him, and sends cheap IBC-monogrammed towels to most of the people on his Christmas list, including his personal assistant Grace and his brother James, while the powerful and influential people on his list get an expensive four-head hi-fi stereo VCR. Seeing the stress Frank is under with the production, Frank's boss Preston Rhinelander brings in consultant Brice Cummings to provide assistance, though Brice secretly wants Frank's job.

The night before the show, Frank is visited by the ghost of his mentor Lew Hayward, an unloved miser who died from a heart attack seven years prior. Lew warns him three more ghosts will appear to him over the next day to help Frank avoid the same fate. Before it vanishes, the ghost dials up Claire Phillips, Frank's lost love from years ago. Claire comes to the network to talk to Frank, but Frank does not make time for her and she returns to the homeless shelter where she works.

As rehearsals start and Frank wraps up his lunch with Preston, Frank is visited by the Ghost of Christmas Past, appearing as a manic taxi driver. He takes Frank to see his past: how he found solace in television to compensate for a cold and distant father, and how he had fallen in love with Claire but lost her when he prioritized his television career over her.

After the visit, Frank goes to the shelter to see Claire, hoping to make amends. However, his attitude quickly sours and he shows his contempt for a homeless man named Herman and the shelter workers. He returns to the studio, but not before telling Claire: "If you wanna save someone, save yourself."

The Ghost of Christmas Present arrives as an ethereal, sweet-voiced fairy who punches, kicks and slaps Frank to focus his attention. She takes him to Grace's apartment, showing his assistant's struggles to support her large family, including her youngest son Calvin who has remained mute since witnessing his father's death. The Ghost then shows him James, spending a humble yet festive Christmas with a group of friends and his wife Wendie. James still defends Frank, despite Frank's cheap gifts and his refusal to share in Christmas celebrations with him. The Ghost leaves him in a utility space under a sidewalk with Herman, who, Frank finds to his shock, has frozen to death.

Frank desperately tries to escape, breaking through a boarded-up door to end back up on the set of the production. Preston directs Brice to take over rehearsals to give Frank some time off. Retiring to his office, Frank finds a drunken Eliot waiting for him with a shotgun, ready to kill Frank for causing the loss of his job and family. Frank escapes into the elevator where the Grim Reaper-like Ghost of Christmas Future awaits. The Ghost takes him to the future where a now-catatonic Calvin has been institutionalized. Claire has heeded Frank's words and lives a decadent life, now viewing the homeless with disgust. Finally, the Ghost shows Frank's cremation ceremony, with only James and Wendie in attendance. Frightened and remorseful, Frank is further shocked to find himself inside the casket as it is about to be incinerated; he breaks his way out, ending up out of the elevator and facing Eliot, so elated to be alive that he is oblivious to the fact that Eliot is still trying to kill him. Frank's completely changed demeanor surprises Eliot, particularly when Frank offers him a high-level executive position.

With Eliot's help, Frank returns to the production set, secures Brice in the control room, and breaks into the show's live broadcast to speak of his new appreciation for life. He apologizes on-air to Grace, James, and the cast and crew, and makes a passionate plea to Claire to come back to him. Claire sees this at the shelter and heads for the network with the help of the Ghost of Christmas Past. As Frank and Claire reunite, Calvin comes up to Frank and speaks for the first time, reminding him to say the words "God bless us, everyone", much to Grace's elation.

Frank leads the crew in singing "Put a Little Love in Your Heart", and sees Lew, the three Ghosts, and the ghost of Herman smiling and waving back to him while singing along as the end credits roll. Then Frank instructs the people in the theater to sing along. James then quotes "My brother the King of Christmas".

Cast

 Bill Murray as Frank Cross, a top executive at IBC Television.
 Ryan Todd as young Frank Cross
 Karen Allen as Claire Phillips, the ex-girlfriend of Frank who works at a homeless shelter.
 John Forsythe as Lew Hayward, the former mentor of Frank who appears as a ghost after dying of a heart attack at a golf course seven years ago.
 Bobcat Goldthwait as Eliot Loudermilk, an executive at IBC Television who Frank fires for questioning him.
 Carol Kane as the Ghost of Christmas Present, she is depicted as a fairy.
 Robert Mitchum as Preston Rhinelander, the head of IBC and Frank's superior.
 Michael J. Pollard as Herman, a homeless man.
 Alfre Woodard as Grace Cooley, the personal assistant of Frank.
 John Glover as Brice Cummings, a consultant hired by Preston to help Frank.
 David Johansen as the Ghost of Christmas Past, he is depicted as a taxi driver.
 Nicholas Phillips as Calvin Cooley, the son of Grace who has been mute since his father was murdered.
 Raphael Harris as an older Calvin.
 Mary Ellen Trainor as Ted
 Mabel King as Gramma, the mother of Grace and the grandmother of Calvin.
 John Murray as James Cross, the brother of Frank.
 Wendie Malick as Wendie Cross, the wife of James.
 Brian Doyle-Murray as Earl Cross, the father of Frank and James.
 Lisa Mende as Doris Cross, the mother of Frank and James.
 Maria Riva as Mrs. Rhinelander, the wife of Preston.
 Al "Red Dog" Weber as Santa Claus, he is seen in the IBC Christmas action special The Night the Reindeer Died.
 Jean Speegle Howard as Mrs. Claus, she is seen in the IBC Christmas action special The Night the Reindeer Died.
 Damon Hines as Steven Cooley, the oldest son of Grace and the brother of Calvin.
 Tamika McCollum as Shasta Cooley, the daughter of Grace and sister of Calvin.
 Koren McCollum as Randee Cooley, the daughter of Grace and sister of Calvin.
 Reina King as Lanell Cooley, the oldest daughter of Grace and sister of Calvin.
 Kate McGregor-Stewart as Lady Censor
 Jack McGee and Bill Hart as the carpenter.
 Kathy Kinney as IBC Nurse
 Tony Steedman as Bobby, a head waiter
 Joel Murray, Susan Isaacs, and Lauri Kempson as the guests at James' Christmas party
 Henry Brown, Jeanine Jackson, and Amy Hill as the technicians
 Robert Hammond as the Ghost of Christmas Future (uncredited), he is depicted as a Grim Reaper whose face is like a television and has strange small creatures in his ribs.
 Don LaFontaine as IBC Promo Announcer (uncredited)Scrooged features a number of cameos. Within the live ICB Christmas Special include John Houseman as the narrator, Buddy Hackett as Ebenezer Scrooge, Mary Lou Retton as "Tiny Tim" Cratchit, Jamie Farr as Jacob Marley, Pat McCormick as the Ghost of Christmas Present, Chaz Conner Jr. as the Ghost of Christmas Future (TV), Paul Shaffer, Larry Carlton, and David Sanborn as the Street Musicians, and Solid Gold Dancers as the Scroogettes. Lee Majors appears as himself who is the star of the IBC Christmas action special The Night the Reindeer Died. Robert Goulet appears as himself in the IBC special Robert Goulet's Old-Fasioned Cajun Christmas. Miles Davis appears as himself. Anne Ramsey and her husband Logan Ramsey cameo as Eva and Billy, Herman's friends at the homeless shelter.

 Production 
 Development Scrooged was filmed on a $32 million budget over three-and-a-half months on sets in Hollywood. Exterior shots of the IBC building were filmed outside of the Seagram Building in New York City. Murray considered himself "rusty" after having left acting for four years following the release of Ghostbusters. He described the success of that film as a phenomenon that would forever be his biggest success, compounded by the failure of The Razor's Edge (1984) made him feel "radioactive" and resulted in him avoiding making movies temporarily.

Murray had the opportunity to work on Scrooged over two years earlier but was enjoying his break from work. When he did feel a desire to return to acting, he said the "scripts were just not that good", and he returned to the Scrooged project as he found the idea of making a funny Scrooge appealing. Murray was paid $6 million for his role. Producer Art Linson justified the figure, by saying that for each year Murray stayed away from films, his audience draw and therefore fee potentially increased. At the time, Linson said that aside from Eddie Murphy, Murray's was the only other name that could draw $10 million of tickets in the opening three to four days.

Murray wanted several changes to the script once he joined the project; among other changes, the romantic plot with Karen Allen's Claire was expanded, and the family scenes were reworked as Murray felt they were "off". Murray worked with scriptwriters Michael O'Donoghue and Mitch Glazer (whom Murray had previously worked with on Saturday Night Live) until Murray was confident enough to begin filming. O'Donoghue and Glazer found the film's denouement, in which Murray reveals his redemption live on TV, to be the most difficult to write. They settled on the example of Christmas Eve in New York, where people are nice to each other for one night, believing it to be a "miracle we could live with".

Murray was concerned with how he should portray the scene, with Glazer telling him to follow the script. Wanting a central acting moment, however, Murray gave an emotional and intense performance, deviating from his marked positions and improvising his speech. Glazer and O'Donoghue thought that the actor was suffering a mental breakdown. After he was finished, the crew applauded Murray, but O'Donoghue remarked "What was that? The Jim Jones hour?" Donner turned and punched O'Donoghue in the arm, leaving him bruised for a week.

In a 1989 interview, Murray said, "He shot a big, long, sloppy movie", describing how a lot of filmed content was not present in the film's final cut. For his part, O'Donoghue later said that Donner did not understand comedy, omitting the script's subtler elements for louder and faster moments. He estimated that only 40% of his and Glazer's original script made it into the final film and the surviving content was "twisted". The final cut of the film runs for 97 minutes.

The production was rife with conflict between Murray and Donner. In a 1990 interview with Roger Ebert, Murray said that Scrooged "could have been a really, really great movie. The script was so good... He [Donner] kept telling me to do things louder, louder, louder. I think he was deaf." In a later 1993 interview, Murray said that he and Donner had different visions for the type of film Scrooged would become, adding that there was potentially only one take in the finished film that was his.

He described the experience as having a "fair amount of misery" and said "That's a tough one; I still have trouble talking about [Scrooged]", describing working on a "dusty, smelly, and smokey" set, feeling alone, and even coughing up blood due to the fake snow being used. He also admitted to feeling pressure from being the solo star of a film compared to previous productions like Ghostbusters, as he was on set mostly every day where some actors would make brief cameos requiring only a day or two of work.

Donner himself said that he had never worked with Murray before and met up with him for drinks before accepting the project to see if they would get along; they did. The director was more positive about their relationship, describing Murray as "superbly creative but occasionally difficult - as difficult as any actor." Donner said that Murray was always in a professional mental state on set, believing it made him stressed, so the crew would do "silly things" to improve morale. Donner had not worked with an improvisational comedian like Murray before, who ad-libbed many of his lines, saying "you don't direct [Murray], you pull him back".

 Casting 
Bill Murray said that "being the meanest person in the world" as Frank Cross was fun. He described his challenge as having an edge but then completing Cross' transformation into a decent person at the end. Murray said "being a decent person is not that hard. But acting like one is." Carol Kane's ghost was intended to have a body double for ballet scenes until set designer saw Kane rehearsing the dance and convinced Donner that the resulting scene would be funnier with Kane's "horrible" dancing.

Donner and Murray said that Kane would sometimes experience long crying periods during filming, caused by frustration over her violent scenes. Murray also endured some physical pain during his encounters with Kane's character, insisting that she actually hit him during their scenes together, and at one point tearing the inside of his lip when Kane pulled his lip too hard. Kane herself said "I hit Bill Murray with a toaster, and with my wings, and I kicked him in areas that weren't pleasant for him. I had fun. I don't think it was as fun for Bill, because he was the victim! I did what the stunt people told me, but when I had to flap my wings in his face, I really couldn't control them."

The film also features Murray's three brothers; Joel Murray cameos as a party guest, Brian Doyle-Murray plays Frank's father, and John Murray plays his on-screen brother James. The film also features the final appearance of the Solid Gold Dancers. Comedian Sam Kinison was considered for the role of the Ghost of Christmas Past before it went to musician David Johansen, a personal friend of Murray's. Robert Mitchum cameos as Frank's boss Preston Rhinelander; the actor was not interested in the small role, but Donner asked him to meet with Murray, who convinced him to take the part. Lee Majors cameos as himself in the film after being contacted directly by Donner. Majors appears in the opening scene helping to save Santa Claus. Majors was armed with a stripped-down M134 Minigun, the same one featured in Predator, which he found difficult to carry due to its weight.

 Soundtrack 
In 1989, A&M Records released the soundtrack to Scrooged, which features nine songs. Seven of the songs were released as singles: Put a Little Love in Your Heart (October 1988), "The Love You Take" (December 1988), "The Christmas Song (Chestnuts Roasting on an Open Fire)" December 1988 "We Three Kings of Orient Are", A Wonderful Life,
Sweetest Thing 1988 Christmas Must Be Tonight.

The rendition of "Put a Little Love in Your Heart" by Al Green and Annie Lennox spent 17 weeks in the U.S. music charts, peaking at number 9 on January 14, 1989.

 Release 
The film's marketing made references to Murray's role in Ghostbusters, with taglines including "Bill Murray is back among the ghosts, only this time, it's three against one". Scrooged premiered in Los Angeles, California on November 17, 1988, followed by its public release on November 23, 1988.

 Box office Scrooged was a moderate box office hit on release in the United States. It earned $18.6 million during its release over its Thanksgiving-extended opening weekend in the United States at 1,262 theaters. It was the highest earning film that weekend, ahead of The Land Before Time ($8.1 million) and Oliver & Company ($6.3 million), both in their second weekend, and made Scrooged the fourth highest-opening weekend of the year.

The second weekend saw an over 40% drop, taking $7.5 million. Over the Christmas holiday period itself, the film had fallen to ninth place, behind The Land Before Time and Oliver & Company. The film left theaters after eight weeks with a total gross of $60.3 million, making it the 13th highest-grossing film of 1988.

The film grossed $40 million overseas for a worldwide total of $100.3 million.

 Home media 
The DVD version was scheduled for re-release on October 31, 2006 as the "Yule Love It!" edition. This version was to include commentary by Donner, "On the set with Bill Murray", Murray's message from the ShoWest exhibitors convention, and other featurettes including "The Look of Scrooged", "Updating Ebeneezer", "Bringing the Ghosts to Life" and "Christmas to Remember". Although Paramount promoted the "Yule Love It!" edition with images of a custom DVD case and a retail price as late as September that year, it missed its release date and it remains unreleased. The reason for this has not been disclosed.Scrooged was released on Blu-ray on November 1, 2011. The release featured a 1080p resolution transfer of the original film and DTS HD Master Audio 5.1 quality sound. The release was criticized for only including the film's theatrical trailer, with Collider's Phil Brown saying "there must be some incredible behind-the-scenes stories to tell."

 Reception 
 Critical response 
Rotten Tomatoes gave the film a score of 69% based on 49 critics. The critics' consensus reads, "Scrooged gets by with Bill Murray and a dash of holiday spirit, although it's hampered by a markedly conflicted tone and an undercurrent of mean-spiritedness."

Pre-release audience screenings in Summer 1988 were positive, with 93% of those surveyed rating the film as "very good", the highest rating studio Paramount Pictures had received at the time. Press screenings nearer to release however were met with responses ranging from ovations to disgruntlement. Audiences polled by CinemaScore gave the film an average grade of "B+" on an A+ to F scale.

On release, reviews were similarly mixed. Roger Ebert called it one of the most "disquieting, unsettling films to come along in quite some time", saying that it portrays pain and anger more than comedy. Empires William Thomas called it a slick and cynical update of Dickens’s tale, but that it is only funny when Murray's character is being a "complete bastard". The Washington Posts Joe Brown said that it was a "sprawling mess", but that he liked it. Brown said that Scrooged was unlikely to become a seasonal tradition like It's a Wonderful Life (1946) and Miracle on 34th Street (1947), considering that it would age poorly and either scare or be too adult for child audiences.

The Los Angeles Timess Sheila Benson said the film's opening is its high-point, featuring the parody IBC lineup of "Robert Goulet's Cajun Christmas" and "The Night the Reindeer Died", but as the film progresses the laughs become more sporadic and the tone becomes darker. Benson said that the film is a "mass of sharp, well-deserved paper cuts" to the entertainment industry, citing Murray's character whose life knowledge is based on the Golden Age of Television, and Mitchum's character who wants to add elements to the network shows that attract pet audiences, but Benson lamented that these details were never expanded upon.The Hollywood Reporter said that the story was uproarious and sometimes vitriolic, labeling it a scathing satire of the entertainment industry, that was a "wild and wooly holiday feast that should scrape off the competition". Their review continued that Scrooged features "wickedly amusing flashbacks", but also some overwrought comic misfires. The Radio Times John Ferguson appreciated the film, calling it a "joyously black Christmas treat", but once the "sentimentality starts seeping in", it seems like a misstep. A 2007 review by Den of Geek agreed, saying that the film and Murray are at their best before the redemption begins, and that the only film to come close to capturing Murray's vitriol was Bad Santa (2003).

Jonathan Rosenbaum called Scrooged an ironic film, for seemingly condemning the commercialization of Christmas while also capitalizing on it, taking on the moral message of A Christmas Carol, "without sacrificing its yuppie priorities for an instant". Rosenbaum cited the ending in particular, wherein Frank gives his Christmas message, causing Karen to leave the needy homeless to come to his side, and both are watched over approvingly by Herman, a homeless man who froze to death. Ebert and Empire concurred about the ending. Ebert said that the necessary words are spoken by the characters, but it lacks heart, continues at embarrassing length, and seems like an onscreen breakdown. Empire also called the ending embarrassing and beyond Murray's capabilities. Conversely, the BBC's Ben Falk said it is hard not to join in singing at the end.

Critics were divided by Murray's performance. Falk said that Murray is a comic genius at his best, and Brown said that he created a credible, comic character. Ferguson said that the first part of Scrooged featured Murray at "his sour faced best". The Hollywood Reporter called him "hilariously convincing" and "impressively sinister" as the TV executive, saying that his hip and sassy performance gives the film energy, nuttiness and charm. Their review said that his deadpan, cutting style was hilarious, but that he layers the character's histrionics with inner sensibility that makes his eventual redemption believable and uplifting.

Conversely, Ebert said that Murray looks genuinely unhappy, and lacked the lightness and good cheer lurking beneath previous performances. Ebert also criticized Murray's ad-libbing, blaming it for being at odds with, and blocking the flow of the story. Benson said that Murray imbued Frank Cross' worst attributes with sincerity, making his redemption difficult to accept.

Carol Kane was praised for her performance, with The Hollywood Reporter referring to her as a "certified hoot", and Entertainment Weeklys Sara Vilkomerson saying that she "steals the show" from Murray. Benson said that watching her fragile, winged character pummel Murray was "strangely satisfying", although the joke eventually wore out. Benson was more positive on Woodard, saying that she offered the film's one completely persuasive performance.The Hollywood Reporter also praised Woodard, Mitchum, and John Glover's credible portrayal of a sleazy executive. Both The Hollywood Reporter and Brown appreciated Goldthwait's role, with Brown calling it "twitchingly touching". Thomas called Johansen's Ghost of Christmas Past a "bonus", but he and Benson lamented the "king's ransom of actors" that were wasted. The Hollywood Reporter said that Elfman's music is "full blast with holiday spirit", and singled out J. Michael Riva's production design, calling it "dead on the mark funny".

O'Donoghue was very critical of the finished film. He said, "We wrote a fucking masterpiece. We wrote It Happened One Night (1934). We wrote a story that could make you laugh and cry. You would have wanted to share it with your grandchildren every fucking Christmas for the next 100 years. The finished film was a piece of unadulterated, unmitigated shit."

 Awards 
Make up artists Thomas R. Burman and Bari Dreiband-Burman were responsible for the film's single nomination at the 61st Academy Awards for Best Makeup, losing to Beetlejuice.

 Legacy 
Since its release, Scrooged has become a cult classic and a Christmas classic, being regularly shown on television during the holiday period. Entertainment Weeklys Whitney Pastorek called it an immortal classic and argued that it is the most underrated Christmas movie. Pastorek said that the film is "both crude and sentimental, resonant and ludicrous...Scrooged is the perfect holiday movie for bitter, reluctant, closet Christmas lovers". The Boston Globes Maura Johnston said that the film was ahead of its time which allowed it to remain relevant years later.PopMatters said that their view of the ongoing commercialization of Christmas, and the film's anticipation of marketing tactics aimed at pets watching television, made the film more relevant now than at the time of its release. In 2012, Den of Geek! described it as the "finest Christmas comedy of all time". Al Green's and Annie Lennox's "Put a Little Love in your Heart" is also played regularly at Christmas despite not being about or mentioning Christmas. O'Donoghue disavowed the film before his death, stating that the script was much funnier than what ended up on screen.

The film also has a score of 38 out of 100 on Metacritic based on 14 critics indicating "generally unfavorable reviews".

In 2015, IGN named it the 11th-best holiday movie of all time. In 2016, Empire listed Scrooged as the seventh-best Christmas film, and in 2017, Time Out and Consequence of Sound listed it as, respectively, the 12th-best and 23rd best. That same year, Collider named it the fifth-best adaptation of A Christmas Carol, calling it is easily the best non-traditional translation of the story, and saying that it uses "a classic tale of redemption as the framework for a satire of modern culture's desire to embrace the irredeemable".

In 2018, The Ringer said that even 30 years after its debut, the film represented the perfect Christmas movie, saying it is "loud, cartoonish, and misanthropic, but... remarkably well-suited for our fraught present moment". David Johansen's New York Dolls bandmate Arthur Kane was sent into a jealous rage after seeing Johansen's prominent role in Scrooged''. Kane reacted by beating his wife, and attempting suicide by jumping from a third-story window.

See also
 List of Christmas films
 List of ghost films
 Adaptations of A Christmas Carol

References

Bibliography

External links 

 
 
 
 

1988 films
1980s Christmas comedy films
1980s fantasy comedy films
1980s ghost films
1988 romantic comedy films
American Christmas comedy films
American fantasy comedy films
American ghost films
American romantic comedy films
1980s English-language films
Films scored by Danny Elfman
Films about television
Films based on A Christmas Carol
Films directed by Richard Donner
Films produced by Art Linson
Films set in New York City
Films set in 1955
Films set in 1968
Films set in 1969
Films set in 1971
Films set in 1988
Films set in the 1990s
Films set in the 2000s
Films shot in New York City
Films shot in Toronto
Paramount Pictures films
Films with screenplays by Michael O'Donoghue
Films with screenplays by Mitch Glazer
Miles Davis
1980s American films